Kosmos 2470 ( meaning Cosmos 2470), also known as Geo-IK-2 No.11, was a Russian geodesy satellite launched in 2011. The first Geo-IK-2 satellite, it was intended to be used to create a three-dimensional map of the Earth's surface, and to monitor plate tectonics.

A second Geo-IK-2 satellite was successfully launched on June 4th, 2016 as Kosmos 2517.

History

Geo-IK-2 No.11 was launched by a Rokot rocket with a Briz-KM upper stage. The launch took place from Site 133/3 at the Plesetsk Cosmodrome, at 14:00 UTC on 1 February 2011. The Rokot performed as expected, and the Briz-KM made the first of two burns to place the satellite into its operational orbit. When the second burn was scheduled to begin, the Briz-KM failed to reignite, leaving the spacecraft in its transfer orbit. Controllers were unable to make contact with the satellite after launch as had been expected, although a day after launch they were able to establish communications with it.

On 24 February 2011, Deputy Defence Minister Vladimir Popovkin announced that the satellite would be unable to fulfill its mission and thus would not be used by Russian defence forces. He added that it might still be possible to use the satellite for "checking control systems". On 1 March the satellite's orientation systems malfunctioned, and the spacecraft moved out of alignment with the Sun, resulting in its solar panels being unable to generate electricity. The spacecraft subsequently began to tumble. Engineers believed that it was unlikely that control would be re-established.

It re-entered Earth's atmosphere on July 15, 2013.

Follow-ons

A second Geo-IK-2 satellite was successfully launched on June 4th, 2016 as Kosmos 2517.

References

Spacecraft launched in 2011
Satellite launch failures
Kosmos satellites
Spacecraft which reentered in 2013
Space accidents and incidents in Russia